Capitol View is a high-rise building located in Washington, D.C., the capital of the United States. Construction of the building began in 2006 and was completed in 2007. The building's architectural style is modern, with the building material being granite. The building was developed by the architectural company, Shalom Baranes Associates, PC. The building was constructed by Clark Construction. The building is estimated to have cost US$37 million to construct. The building was awarded the 2007 Washington Building Congress Craftsmanship Award for Sitework.

See also
List of tallest buildings in Washington, D.C.

References

Skyscraper office buildings in Washington, D.C.

Office buildings completed in 2007
2007 establishments in Washington, D.C.